Coeliac UK is a UK charity for people with coeliac disease - a condition estimated to affect 1 out of every 100 people and to be twice as common in women as in men - and the skin manifestation of the condition, dermatitis herpetiformis (DH).

History
Founded in 1968 by Amnesty International founder Peter Benenson, and Elizabeth Segall, Coeliac UK (originally called The Coeliac Society) launched the first symbol that acknowledged and advertised that a product contained no gluten, namely the Crossed Grain symbol. Noted clinician Sir Christopher Booth was a founding member.

The charity renamed itself Coeliac UK in 2001 and has since established the All Party Parliamentary Group on coeliac disease and DH and worked with the Food Standards Agency to introduce a new law that governed the labelling of gluten-free food.

English actress Caroline Quentin is the current patron of the charity.

References

External links
 

Food policy in the United Kingdom
Health charities in the United Kingdom
Organizations established in 1968